The women's 3000 metres event at the 1992 World Junior Championships in Athletics was held in Seoul, Korea, at Olympic Stadium on 18 and 20 September.

Medalists

Results

Final
20 September

Heats
18 September

Heat 1

Heat 2

Participation
According to an unofficial count, 21 athletes from 17 countries participated in the event.

References

3000 metres
Long distance running at the World Athletics U20 Championships